

David Kalvitis is an artist, graphic designer, puzzle inventor, and owner of Monkeying Around, publisher of his collections of dot-to-dot-puzzles. Born in Poughkeepsie, New York, Kalvitis is the eldest of three children.  He currently resides in Rochester, New York.

Kalvitis is a graduate of Syracuse University, where he earned a Fine Arts degree in Editorial Design. During his senior year, he placed second in the International Print Magazine Cover Design Contest.

After running his own graphic design business in Rochester for 13 years, Kalvitis began his publishing career with the creation of The Greatest Dot-to-Dot Books in the World in 2000.

Since 2000 Kalvitis has published 18 hand-designed puzzle books. 

To date, his books have sold over one million copies worldwide.

Published works

Books
The Greatest Dot-to-Dot Books in the World Monkeying Around
Book 1, 2000 – 
Book 2, 2001 – 
Book 3, 2002 – 
Book 4, 2003 – 
The Greatest Dot-to-Dot Super Challenge Books Monkeying Around
Book 5, 2007 – 
Book 6, 2008 – 
Book 7, 2009 – 
Book 8, 2010 – 
The Greatest Dot-to-Dot Adventure Books Monkeying Around
Book 1, 2012 - 
Book 2, 2014 - 
 We Are Connected Dot-to-Dot Philadelphia Book Monkeying Around
 2017 - 
The Greatest Dot-to-Dot Mini Travel Newspaper Books Monkeying Around
Volume 1, 2005 – 
Volume 2, 2005 – 
Volume 3, 2006 – 
Volume 4, 2006 – 
Volume 5, 2007 – 
Volume 6, 2007 – 
Volume 7, 2011 – 
Volume 8, 2011 –

Awards 
 Creative Child Magazine Awards 2015 Book of the Year Award
 National Parenting Center Seal of Approval Holiday 2012 Seal of Approval
 National Parenting Center Seal of Approval Holiday 2010 Seal of Approval
 National Parenting Center Seal of Approval Holiday 2003 Seal of Approval

Jointly authored books
Twisting History: Lessons in Balloon Sculpting Parma Publishing, 1995

References

Memmott, Jim (March 24, 2007). Puzzles offer fun on the dot. Democrat & Chronicle.
York, Michelle (May 15, 2006). If numbers don't add up, try connecting the dots. The New York Times.
Ramsay, Maggie (March 19, 2006). Dots amore. Sunday Messenger.
Ramsay, Maggie (December 21, 2005). Connecting the dots. Brighton-Pittsford Post.
Memmott, Jim (December 10, 2005). Dot-to-dot puzzle guy links up with the kid in all of us. Democrat & Chronicle.
Arbelo, Enid (July 22, 2002). Dot-to-dot turns profit from naught. Democrat & Chronicle.
Di Natale, Chuck (June 29, 2000). Connecting dots links FHS grad to fun, profit. Perinton-Fairport Post.

Living people
Puzzle designers
People from Poughkeepsie, New York
Syracuse University alumni
Year of birth missing (living people)